Daniel David O'Brien (born 2 April 1974) is an Australian politician, and a Member of the Victorian Legislative Assembly representing the electoral district of Gippsland South for the Nationals.

O'Brien was born and raised in Traralgon in Victoria's Gippsland region. He began his career as a journalist, and later became chief of staff to Peter Ryan, then a senior advisor to Deputy Prime Minister Mark Vaile, and worked in the trade department of the Australian embassy in Jakarta. He then became chief of staff to Senator Barnaby Joyce, but within six months was preselected to replace a member for Eastern Victoria Region, Peter Hall, who had resigned from the Victorian Legislative Council on 17 March 2014. O'Brien was appointed to replace Hall at a joint sitting of the Victorian Parliament on 26 March.

In February 2015, O'Brien sought and gained pre-selection for the lower house seat of Gippsland South, in the March 2015 by-election brought about by the resignation of Peter Ryan. He won the by-election on 14 March.

References

External links
 Parliamentary voting record of Danny O'Brien at Victorian Parliament Tracker
Parliamentary biography

1974 births
Living people
Members of the Victorian Legislative Council
Members of the Victorian Legislative Assembly
National Party of Australia members of the Parliament of Victoria
Australian political consultants
People from Traralgon
21st-century Australian politicians